The fulvous-breasted woodpecker (Dendrocopos macei) is a species of bird in the family Picidae.
It is found in Bangladesh, Bhutan, Nepal, India and Myanmar.  The freckle-breasted woodpecker was formerly considered conspecific with this species.

Description
A medium-sized, pied woodpecker. Upperparts black, heavily barred white. Undertail red, breast and belly buff with light flank barring and slight side streaking. Withish cheeks partly bordered by black line. Crown red in male with orange forehead, black in female.

Habitat
Its natural habitats are subtropical or tropical dry forest, subtropical or tropical moist lowland forest, and subtropical or tropical moist montane forest.

Gallery

References

External links

fulvous-breasted woodpecker
Birds of North India
Birds of Nepal
Birds of Eastern Himalaya
Birds of Bangladesh
Birds of India
Birds of Myanmar
fulvous-breasted woodpecker
fulvous-breasted woodpecker
Taxonomy articles created by Polbot